Vera Ðurašković, born Čerepina, (born 29 August 1949) is a former basketball player who competed for Yugoslavia in the 1980 Summer Olympics.

References

1949 births
Living people
Serbian women's basketball players
Olympic medalists in basketball
Olympic basketball players of Yugoslavia
Basketball players at the 1980 Summer Olympics
Olympic bronze medalists for Yugoslavia
Yugoslav women's basketball players
Shooting guards
Medalists at the 1980 Summer Olympics